Matthew Zane Leopold is an American attorney at Hunton Andrews Kurth LLP and former government official who served as the Assistant Administrator of the United States Environmental Protection Agency (General Counsel). Prior to assuming this role, Leopold was a lawyer with the law firm of Carlton Fields.

Professional background 
Leopold previously served as general counsel of the Florida Department of Environment Protection. He was also an attorney at the United States Department of Justice's Environment and Natural Resources Division. Leopold's legal practice focuses on environmental law, policy, and litigation. He has represented the state and federal governments on complex environmental litigation, including Florida v. Georgia and United States v. BP Exploration and Production, Inc., which addressed the 2010 Deepwater Horizon oil spill in the Gulf of Mexico. Leopold also represented Florida in litigation related to the Everglades. He previously served as an environmental policy advisor for former Florida Governor Jeb Bush.  He is a graduate of the University of Florida and Florida State University School of Law.

Leopold announced his intention to leave the Environmental Protection Agency in September 2020, and  joined  Hunton Andrews Kurth as a partner in October 2020.

References

External links
 Biography at Carlton Fields

Living people
University of Florida alumni
Florida State University College of Law alumni
Florida lawyers
Trump administration personnel
People of the United States Environmental Protection Agency
Year of birth missing (living people)